Reginald "Rex" Corbett (13 June 1879 – 2 September 1967) was an English international footballer, who played as an outside left.

Career
Born in Thame, Corbett played for Old Malvernians, and earned one cap for England in 1903.

References

1879 births
1967 deaths
English footballers
England international footballers
Old Malvernians F.C. players
People educated at Malvern College
Association football forwards